Košarkaški klub Star, commonly referred to as KK Star, is a men's basketball club based in  Novi Sad, Serbia. They are currently competing in the Second Basketball League of Serbia.

History 
Founded in April 2004 in Novi Ledinci, the club used to play in the 3rd-tier First Regional League of Serbia, North Division.

In September 2020, they got a wild card and promotion to the Second Basketball League of Serbia for the 2020–21 season following withdrawal of Spartak.

Home arena

Star plays its home games at the SPC Vojvodina small hall. The hall is located in Novi Sad, Vojvodina Province, and was built in 1981. The small hall has a seating capacity of 1,030 seats.

Players 

 Danilo Mijatović

Head coaches 
  Dimitrije Živković (2019–2021)
  Aleksandar Komnenić (2021–present)

Trophies and awards

Trophies
 Second Regional League, North–N Division (4th-tier)
 Winners (1): 2017–18

See also 
 KK Vojvodina

References

External links
 
 Profile 1 and Profile 2 at srbijasport.net 
 Profile at eurobasket.com

Star
Star
Star
Sport in Novi Sad